The South African Trades and Labour Council (SAT&LC) was a national trade union federation in South Africa.

History
The federation was founded in 1930, when the South African Trades Union Council merged with the Cape Federation of Labour Unions.  The federation was broadly split between the craft unions and mining unions, which generally only admitted white workers and took conservative positions; and a growing number of industrial unions, which admitted white, Asian and "coloured" members, and often worked closely with unions representing black workers.

In 1944, the federation adopted the Workers' Charter, which aimed to bring about a socialist government.  In 1947, some unions of white workers resigned in opposition to the SAT&LC admitting black workers, and they formed the pro-apartheid Co-ordinating Council of South African Trade Unions.  A further group of right-wing craft unions left in 1951 to form the South African Federation of Trade Unions.

In 1950, the Government of South Africa introduced the Suppression of Communism Act, which made it extremely difficult to maintain unions open to both black and white workers.  The SAT&LC became increasingly divided, with some unions supporting the liberation of black workers, reform of the federation's discriminatory constitution, and the formation of local committees to organise all workers.  Other unions, principally those craft unions already restricted to white workers, opposed these ideas.  In 1954, they walked out of the federation's congress, and founded the new Trade Union Council of South Africa (TUCSA), which did not accept black workers.

Nineteen SAT&LC affiliates refused to join the TUCSA, and instead former a Trade Union Co-ordinating Committee.  In 1955, this merged with the Council of Non-European Trade Unions, to form the South African Congress of Trade Unions.

Affiliates
The following unions were affiliated in 1947:

General Secretaries
1930: William H. Andrews
1932: Alexander Gordon Forsyth
1937: Willie de Vries
1948: Alexander Gordon Forsyth
1951: Harry Boyder and Dulcie Hartwell
1953: Dulcie Hartwell

References

National trade union centres of South Africa
Trade unions established in 1930
Trade unions disestablished in 1954